Highpoint (also known as High Point) is an unincorporated community and census-designated place (CDP) in Sycamore Township, Hamilton County, Ohio, United States, located about 20 miles north of Cincinnati, Ohio. As of the 2020 census, its population was 1,558. Highpoint was founded in the 19th century. It was named Highpoint on account of its lofty elevation.

References

External links
 Sycamore Township Zoning History

Census-designated places in Hamilton County, Ohio
Census-designated places in Ohio
Unincorporated communities in Ohio
Unincorporated communities in Hamilton County, Ohio